Niles Paul (born August 9, 1989) is a former American football tight end. He played college football as a wide receiver at the University of Nebraska–Lincoln and was selected in the fifth round of the 2011 NFL Draft by the Washington Redskins.

Early years
Paul attended Omaha North High School in Omaha, Nebraska, where he was a three-sport star in football, track, and basketball. In football, Paul helped North to a 9-2 record and a trip to the Class A state quarterfinals. He was named a first-team All-Nebraska and first-team All-Metro selection by the Omaha World-Herald and a first-team Super-State pick by the Lincoln Journal Star. He was also one of 58 players who were selected as a Parade All-American. Paul averaged 19.5 yards on 32 receptions and caught 10 touchdown passes as a junior, and also averaged 25.6 yards per kickoff return. As a senior, Paul hauled in 46 passes for 814 yards and 13 touchdowns for Coach Larry Martin. He averaged nearly 18 yards per reception, and also averaged better than 18 yards per punt return. Paul was invited to play at the U.S. Army All-American Game in San Antonio, Texas, and he led the West team in receiving yards.

In track & field, Paul won the 110-meter hurdles at the state meet as both a junior (14.71s) and a senior (14.33s), while finishing second in the 300-meter hurdles (38.34s) and fourth in the 100-meter dash (11.00s) as a senior. His 4x100-meter relay team also finished second with a time of 42.30 seconds. In 2006, he led the Vikings to the Class A state track title by winning four gold medals. Individually, he captured the Class A titles in the 110m hurdles and 300m hurdles and was part of the all-class gold medal teams in the 4 × 100 m (42.31) and 4x400-meter (3:18.80) relays. On the basketball court, Paul was among the Class A leaders in scoring and rebounding, averaging nearly 19 points and 12 rebounds per game as a senior.

Paul was regarded as the top prospect in the state of Nebraska in 2007, and was NU's first signee from Omaha North since 1998. He was regarded as one of the top 20 receiving prospects in the country by both Rivals.com and Scout.com.

College career
Paul played for the University of Nebraska football team from 2007 to 2010. He finished his college career with 103 receptions for 1,532 yards and 5 touchdowns. His career total of 4,122 all-purpose yards ranks fifth all-time in Nebraska history.

Professional career

Washington Redskins

2011 season
The Washington Redskins selected Paul in the fifth round (155th overall) of the 2011 NFL Draft. He was signed to a four-year contract on July 29, 2011. Paul made his NFL debut in Week 1 against the New York Giants.
In Week 3 against the St. Louis Rams, he made an impressive hit on Austin Pettis during a punt return that caused him to lose the ball, but Paul was penalized for an illegal tackle. On October 5, 2011, Paul was fined $20,000 for a helmet-to-helmet hit on Pettis.
In Week 7 against the Carolina Panthers, Paul had his first career start as well as made his first two career catches. Contributing more to special teams, Paul played a total of 13 games, starting in two of them, and recorded two catches for 25 yards by the end of 2011 season.

2012 season
On April 20, 2012, it was reported that Paul had been attending the team's tight end meetings and would be switching from wide receiver to tight end. During the offseason some of the Redskins' staff, including coach Mike Shanahan and teammate Darrel Young, compared him to former tight end, Shannon Sharpe. In the Week 12 win against the Dallas Cowboys on Thanksgiving, Paul scored his first career touchdown.

2013 season
During the 2013 offseason, Paul was trained to be the backup fullback behind starter Darrel Young. He would get his first start at fullback in Week 12 against the San Francisco 49ers due to Young being inactive because of injury.

2014 season
During the 2014 season, Paul took over at tight end after Jordan Reed was injured in Week 1. Paul made a name for himself by accumulating 21 catches for 313 yards and 1 touchdown prior to suffering a helmet-to-helmet hit in a Week 4 Thursday Night Football game by New York Giants defensive back Quentin Demps. Immediately after impact, Paul displayed the classic fencing response, a symptom of a serious concussion.

2015 season
On March 6, 2015, the Redskins re-signed Paul to a three-year, $10 million contract. Paul suffered a season-ending ankle fracture dislocation during the first preseason game against the Cleveland Browns. On August 16, 2015, the Redskins placed him on injured reserve.

2016 season
On November 8, 2016, Paul was placed on injured reserve after suffering a knee injury in Week 8 against the Cincinnati Bengals.

Jacksonville Jaguars
On March 15, 2018, Paul signed a two-year contract with the Jacksonville Jaguars. He was placed on injured reserve on October 16, 2018 with a knee injury. He was released on December 14, 2018.

San Francisco 49ers
On July 26, 2019, Paul signed a one-year contract with the San Francisco 49ers, but was released on August 2, 2019.

Retirement
On August 6, 2019, Paul announced his retirement.

References

External links

 
 Washington Redskins bio
 Nebraska Cornhuskers bio

1989 births
Living people
American football tight ends
American football wide receivers
American football return specialists
Jacksonville Jaguars players
Nebraska Cornhuskers football players
Players of American football from Nebraska
San Francisco 49ers players
Sportspeople from Omaha, Nebraska
Washington Redskins players
Omaha North High School alumni
Ed Block Courage Award recipients